Ciné FX was a French television channel, owned by AB Groupe.

The channel was originally only available via AB Sat and as an option on CanalSat, but is now available through contract on the cinema option from AB, on cable, on ADSL, and on digital television packages.

At its start, in 1996, the cinema package of the AB group comprised five channels, but none which dealt with science fiction films. When the cinema package was reformatted on 15 September 2002, the channel created three others: Ciné Comic, Ciné Polar, and Ciné Box to replace the former CINEBOX. Today, the package is named CINERAMA and comprises this channel, as well as Ciné Polar, Ciné First, and Ciné Pop.

The programming comprises science fiction films from the 1950s to today, covering every subgenre, including programming the classics, Forbidden Planet, the films of Roger Corman, the studio Troma, and films such as 2001: A Space Odyssey.

Sundance Channel replaces Ciné FX on CanalSat on 1 July 2015 and Orange on 20 November 2015.

Ciné FX and Polar are replaced by Paramount Channel and Crime District on 6 December 2016 on Bis Télévisions.

The shutdown of Ciné FX and Polar was scheduled for April 30, 2018, but they were finally withdrawn from Bouygues Télécom and Numéricable-SFR. Both channels continued on Free until July 31, 2018.

References

External links
 Programmes on Ciné FX
 The site of AB Groupe

Mediawan Thematics
Television stations in France
Defunct television channels in France
French-language television stations
Television channels and stations established in 1996